Wuxi IFS is a late-modernist supertall skyscraper in Wuxi, China. Construction of the -glass and steel-building was completed in 2014.

See also
 List of tallest buildings in China

References

Skyscrapers in Wuxi
Office buildings completed in 2014
2014 establishments in China
Skyscraper office buildings in China
Residential skyscrapers in China
Skyscraper hotels in China
Retail buildings in China
The Wharf (Holdings)